Gaigirgordub, called El Porvenir until July 1, 2016, is the capital of the Panamanian comarca (indigenous territory) of Guna Yala. The settlement is located on a small island and contains a landing strip, a museum (the Museo de la Nación Guna, or Museum of the Guna Nation), a hotel, government offices, and an artisans' cooperative. There is also a small beach.

References

External links

Populated places in Guna Yala